Käthe Voderberg (1 August 1910 – 10 May 1978) née Nehls was a German botanist. She was a professor and the director of the institute for botany at the Humboldt University of Berlin.

Life 
Voderberg studied natural sciences in Hamburg, Berlin, Innsbruck and Greifswald from 1930 to 1935. She finished her doctorate in botany at the University of Greifswald in 1936. In 1947, she habilitated at the University of Greifswald and became a lecturer at the Humboldt University of Berlin. 

In 1951, she was appointed professor and director of the institute for botany at the Humboldt University of Berlin. In 1956, she became head of the Agricultural Department. Starting in 1961, she was a professor with a chair in botany and dean of the faculty for Agriculture (1st female dean of the faculty). In 1970, she became an emeritus professor. She died in 1978.

Research 
During her habilitation, her research focused on the development of the fruit body of the Coprinus lagopus.

Selected publications

References 

20th-century German botanists
University of Greifswald alumni
Academic staff of the Humboldt University of Berlin
1910 births
1978 deaths